TCDD DE 33000 is a type of diesel-electric locomotive built for operations on Turkish State Railways by Tülomsaş. It is model GT26CW-2 designed by General Motors Electro-Motive Diesel and using the famous EMD 645 two stroke diesel engine and using the EMD Dash 2 electronic module. It has been revised to have EMD Dash 3 like microprocessor control in 2017. This batch has air starter.

Total initial order was for 65 units, followed by supplemental orders to increase the quantity to 89, with delivery starting in 2003.

External links
 Tülomsaş page on DE 33000
 Trains of Turkey on DE 33000

Tülomsaş locomotives
Co-Co locomotives
Turkish State Railways diesel locomotives
Standard gauge locomotives of Turkey
Railway locomotives introduced in 2003